Arash Rezavand is an Iranian football midfielder who plays for Esteghlal in the Persian Gulf Pro League.

International career
He was first called up to the national team in 2019 by Mark Wilmots and made his national debut.

Career
Arash Rezavand started his professional career with Naft Tehran on loan from Esteghlal in 2013–14 Iran Pro League. Later he joined Naft Tehran permanently with a 3 years contract until end of 2016−17 Iran Pro League. He later joined Saipa football team and after brilliant games for this team, he joined Esteghlal Tehran

Club career statistics

International career

Under-23 career

He invited to Iran U-23 training camp by Nelo Vingada to preparation for Incheon 2014 and 2016 AFC U-22 Championship (Summer Olympic qualification). He made his debut in a friendly match against Jordan and scored the first goal in 2–2 draw. He named in Iran U23 final list for Incheon 2014.

International goals

U23
Scores and results list Iran's goal tally first.

Honours
Foolad
Iranian Super Cup: 2021
Esteghlal 
Iranian Super Cup:  2022

References

External links

 

Arash Rezavand at TeamMelli.com
Arash Rezavand at PersianLeague.com  
Arash Rezavand at ThePlayersAgent.com 

Arash Rezavand at IranLeague.ir  
Arash Rezavand at ffiri.ir

1993 births
Living people
Sportspeople from Tehran
Iranian footballers
Association football midfielders
Esteghlal F.C. players
Naft Tehran F.C. players
Foolad FC players
Footballers at the 2014 Asian Games
Asian Games competitors for Iran